The Mouse and the Motorcycle is a children's novel written by Beverly Cleary, illustrated by Louis Darling and published in 1965. It is the first in a trilogy featuring Ralph S. Mouse, a house mouse who can speak to humans (though typically only children), goes on adventures riding his miniature motorcycle, and who longs for excitement and independence while living with his family in a run-down hotel.

The story and characters were inspired both by Cleary's son, who while recovering from a fever played with miniature cars and motorcycles, and by a neighbor who had shown Cleary a small mouse that had been trapped in a bucket.

The book was released as a selection of the Weekly Reader Children's Book Club (Intermediate Division) and won the William Allen White Children's Book Award in 1968. Cleary went on to write two more books featuring the Ralph S. Mouse character in the following decades, and a film adaptation of The Mouse and The Motorcycle was produced in 1986.

Plot summary 
Ralph is a mouse who lives in the run-down Mountain View Inn, a battered resort hotel in the Sierra Nevada mountain range of California. Ralph longs for a life of danger and speed, wishing to get away from his relatives, who worry about the mice colony being discovered. One day a boy named Keith Gridley and his family visit the hotel on their way through California. Keith leaves a toy motorcycle on his bedside table. While Keith is away, Ralph attempts to ride it, but cannot figure out how to start it. Startled by a telephone ring, both Ralph and the motorcycle fall into a metal wastebasket.

Keith discovers his missing motorcycle in the wastebasket. Although Ralph's mother worries that he is in contact with humans, Keith shows Ralph how to start the motorcycle—make an engine-like noise—and lets Ralph ride it at night. While Keith and his family explore California, Ralph recklessly rides the motorcycle through the depths of the hotel. One night he is spotted by Keith's mother, who initially thinks she is imagining things, but later is sure that she saw a mouse riding a motorcycle. Ralph and the motorcycle are almost sucked up by a maid's vacuum cleaner, but Ralph escapes, riding into a pile of linen and dirty bedsheets. He escapes by chewing holes in the sheets, forced to leave the precious vehicle behind.

After Ralph loses the motorcycle, Keith loses trust in him, though he still brings the mice colony food. One night Keith becomes very sick, because his parents don't have any more aspirin and are unable to obtain one until morning. To regain Keith's trust, Ralph searches the hotel for an aspirin tablet, at risk to himself, for the medicine could prove fatal to a small mouse if ingested (in fact, Ralph's father was taken down with a bad cold and died in spite of all they could do). Ralph is able to find an aspirin tablet and borrows Keith's toy ambulance to retrieve it. When Ralph is successful, Keith's health is restored, one of the hotel's housekeepers had even found his motorcycle among the linens from which Ralph escaped. In gratitude, Keith gives Ralph the motorcycle to keep, Ralph uses the space under the TV set in the lobby as a garage.

Series 
 The Mouse and the Motorcycle (1965)
 Runaway Ralph (1970)
 Ralph S. Mouse (1982)

Film adaptation
Churchill Films produced an adaptation of The Mouse and the Motorcycle directed by Ron Underwood in 1986, featuring Mimi Kennedy and Ray Walston.

The film was distributed by Strand VCI Entertainment, Golden Book Video under the "GoldenVision" label, and Weston Woods Studios.

References

1965 American novels
1965 children's books
ABC Weekend Special
American novels adapted into films
Children's books adapted into films
English-language novels
Books about mice and rats
Motorcycling in fiction
Novels set in California
Novels set in hotels
Novels by Beverly Cleary